Air vice-marshal Sir Francis John Williamson Mellersh,  (22 September 1898 – 25 May 1955) was a Royal Naval Air Service aviator and flying ace credited with five aerial victories during the First World War, and a senior commander in the Royal Air Force during the 1940s and 1950s. He was killed in a helicopter accident in 1955.

First World War
Mellersh joined the Royal Naval Air Service in 1916. He trained as a fighter pilot and was posted to 9 Naval Squadron in 1917. While flying a Sopwith Triplane on 28 July 1917, he drove down an Aviatik C. He switched to flying a Sopwith Camel and scored victories 15 October 1917 and 12 April 1918; the latter win was shared with squadron-mate Roy Brown. On 21 April 1918, Mellersh was a flight commander involved in the dogfight that brought down the Red Baron, Manfred von Richthofen; Mellersh claimed a Fokker Dr.I triplane destroyed on that date. His last victory came two days later.

Death
Mellersh debarked from a helicopter onto a quay on 25 May 1955; he had been invited to cruise on a yacht belonging to the Itchenor Yacht Club. As the helicopter departed, one of its rotors hit the mast of a yacht. As the copter crashed, the main rotor killed Mellersh.

References

Footnotes

Bibliography
Above the Trenches: a Complete Record of the Fighter Aces and Units of the British Empire Air Forces 1915–1920. Christopher F. Shores, Norman L. R. Franks, Russell Guest. Grub Street, 1990. , .

External links
Air of Authority – A History of RAF Organisation – Air Vice Marshal Sir Francis Mellersh
The Aerodrome – Francis Mellersh
King's College London – Liddell Hart Centre for Military Archives – MELLERSH, Sir Francis John Williamson

|-

|-

|-

|-

Royal Air Force air marshals
Knights Commander of the Order of the British Empire
Recipients of the Air Force Cross (United Kingdom)
British World War I flying aces
Royal Naval Air Service aviators
Royal Navy officers of World War I
Royal Air Force personnel of World War I
Royal Air Force personnel of World War II
1898 births
1955 deaths
Victims of helicopter accidents or incidents
Military personnel from Surrey